Şehzade Mehmed Şevket Efendi (5 June 1872 – 22 October 1899) was an Ottoman prince, the son of Sultan Abdulaziz and Neşerek Kadın.

Early life
Şehzade Mehmed Şevket was born on 5 June 1872 in the Dolmabahçe Palace. His father was Abdulaziz, son of Mahmud II and Pertevniyal Sultan, and his mother was Neşerek Kadın, daughter of Prince Ismail Zevş-Barakay. He had a sister Emine Sultan, two years younger than him.

Abdulaziz was deposed on 30 May 1876 and was succeeded by his nephew Murad V. On 4 June 1876, Abdulaziz died under mysterious circumstances. His mother died a few days later, on 11 June 1876. Şevket was only four years old that time, Abdul Hamid II took care of Şevket and raised him with his sons.

Şevket began his education at Ihlamur Pavilion, in 1879, along with his sister Esma Sultan and brother Şehzade Mehmed Seyfeddin and Sultan Abdul Hamid's children Şehzade Mehmed Selim and Zekiye Sultan.

His circumcision took place on 17 December 1883, along with his brothers Abdulmejid II, Şehzade Mehmed Seyfeddin, Şehzade Mehmed Selim eldest son of Sultan Abdul Hamid, Şehzade Ibrahim Tevfik, grandson of Abdulmejid I, and Şehzade Mehmed Ziyaeddin, eldest son of Mehmed V. His circumcision was carried out by Rıfat or Saib Pasha.

Military career
Mehmed Şevket was enlisted in the imperial Ottoman Navy during the reign of his father. He was given the rank of lieutenant on 27 May 1875. A year later in 1876, he was promoted to the rank of lieutenant-commander.

Personal life
Şevket's only wife was Fatma Ruyinaz Hanım. She was born on 2 January 1873 in Bandırma. They married on 3 April 1890 in the Yıldız Palace, when Şevket was twenty and Ruyinaz was seventeen years old. She was the mother of the couple's only child Şehzade Mehmed Cemaleddin, born on 1 March 1891. She died 7 August 1960 in Beirut, Lebanon.

Şevket owned the Malta Pavilion located in the Yıldız Palace. He also owned a villa in Küçük Çamlıca, Üsküdar. He was a pianist by avocation.

Death
Mehmed Şevket died on 22 October 1899, at the age of twenty-seven, and was buried in the mausoleum of his grandfather Mahmud II, Divanyolu, Istanbul. Present day Sultan Abdulaziz's male generation is descended from Mehmed Şevket.

Honours

Military appointments
Military ranks and naval appointments
 27 May 1875: Lieutenant, Ottoman Navy
 1876: Lieutenant-Commander, Ottoman Navy

Issue

Ancestry

References

Sources

 

Ottoman princes
19th-century Ottoman royalty
1869 births
1899 deaths
Royalty from Istanbul